Hippopotamus melitensis is an extinct hippopotamus from Malta. It lived during Middle-Late Pleistocene. It probably descended from Hippopotamus pentlandi from Sicily, which in turn probably descended from the common hippopotamus (Hippopotamus amphibius). Like Hippopotamus pentlandi, Hippopotamus melitensis is substantially smaller in size than H. amphibius as a result of insular dwarfism, having an estimated mass of approximately 900 kg, which is smaller than the 1100 kg estimated for H. pentlandi. The diet of H. melitensis is suggested to have been more generalist than Hippopotamus amphibius (which is predominanty a grazer), likely as a result of limited resource diversity and lack of competition, as the only other large herbivore on the island was the dwarf elephant Palaeoloxodon mnaidriensis. The majority of findings of this species are from Għar Dalam, a cave on Malta famous for its Pleistocene fossil deposits.

See also
 Cyprus dwarf hippopotamus
 Cretan dwarf hippopotamus

References 

Extinct hippopotamuses
Pleistocene even-toed ungulates
Extinct mammals of Europe
Messinian
Fossil taxa described in 1902